Muneeba Ali Siddiqui (born 8 August 1997) is a Pakistani cricketer who plays as a wicket-keeper and left-handed batter. She currently plays for Pakistan, and has played domestic cricket for Balochistan, Omar Associates, Karachi, State Bank of Pakistan, and Zarai Taraqiati Bank Limited.

Career 
She was part of the Pakistan squad at the 2016 ICC Women's World Twenty20, making her WT20I debut in the competition. She made her Women's One Day International (WODI) debut for Pakistan against Sri Lanka on 20 March 2018.

In October 2018, she was named in Pakistan's squad for the 2018 ICC Women's World Twenty20 tournament in the West Indies. In January 2020, she was named in Pakistan's squad for the 2020 ICC Women's T20 World Cup in Australia. In December 2020, she was shortlisted as one of the Women's Cricketer of the Year for the 2020 PCB Awards.

In October 2021, she was named in Pakistan's team for the 2021 Women's Cricket World Cup Qualifier tournament in Zimbabwe. In January 2022, she was named in Pakistan's team for the 2022 Women's Cricket World Cup in New Zealand. In May 2022, she was named in Pakistan's team for the cricket tournament at the 2022 Commonwealth Games in Birmingham, England.

On 15 February 2023, Ali became the first Pakistani woman to score a WT20I century when she scored 102 off 68 balls against Ireland in Pakistan's second match of the 2023 ICC Women's T20 World Cup in South Africa. This also made her only the sixth batter to score a century at the Women's T20 World Cup.

References

External links
 
 

Ali, Muneeba
Ali, Muneeba
Cricketers from Karachi
Muhajir people
Pakistani women cricketers
Pakistan women One Day International cricketers
Pakistan women Twenty20 International cricketers
Baluchistan women cricketers
Omar Associates women cricketers
Karachi women cricketers
State Bank of Pakistan women cricketers
Zarai Taraqiati Bank Limited women cricketers
Cricketers at the 2022 Commonwealth Games
Commonwealth Games competitors for Pakistan